A national unity government was formed on 30 October 1937, headed by Khayreddin al-Ahdab, and composed of four National Bloc members and three from the Constitutional Bloc. It won the confidence of the parliament with a majority of 56 votes. On 8 January 1938, Salim Takla, Majid Arslam and Habib Abou Chahla resigned, so President Émile Eddé replaced them with three Nationals. The decision faced opposition from the Constitutionals, and requested re-discussion of the confidence. This would lead to the Fifth Cabinet of Khayreddin Ahdab on 13 January.

Composition

References 

Cabinets established in 1937
Cabinets disestablished in 1938
Cabinets of Lebanon
1937 establishments in Lebanon
1938 disestablishments in Lebanon